"Bugatti" is a song by American rapper Ace Hood featuring fellow American rappers Future and Rick Ross. Written alongside producers Mike WiLL Made It and J-Bo, it was released on January 29, 2013, as the lead single from the former's fourth studio album, Trials & Tribulations. The song peaked at number 33 on the Billboard Hot 100, making it Ace Hood's most successful single of his career. The single has sold over one million copies and was certified platinum by the RIAA.

Music video
The music video was directed by Gil Green and premiered on 106 & Park on February 6, 2013. DJ Khaled, Rocko, Birdman, and Kobe Bryant all make cameo appearances in the video.

Uses in other media
The song made an appearance in Grand Theft Auto V on the Radio Los Santos station.

Track listing
 Digital single

Charts

Weekly charts

Year-end charts

Release history

Remixes

On May 6, 2013, the song's official remix was released, featuring hip hop acts Wiz Khalifa, T.I., Meek Mill, French Montana, 2 Chainz, Future, DJ Khaled and Birdman. The remix is included on the deluxe edition of Ace Hood's Trials & Tribulations album. Lil Wayne freestyled the song along with Boo on his mixtape Dedication 5.

Awards and nominations

Certifications

References

2013 singles
Ace Hood songs
Songs written by Ace Hood
Rick Ross songs
Songs written by Rick Ross
Future (rapper) songs
Music videos directed by Gil Green
Cash Money Records singles
Songs about cars
Song recordings produced by Mike Will Made It
2013 songs
Songs written by Future (rapper)
Songs written by Mike Will Made It